Secrets of the Underground is a 1942 American crime film directed by William Morgan and written by Robert Tasker and Daniel Mainwaring. The film stars John Hubbard, Virginia Grey, Lloyd Corrigan, Robin Raymond, Miles Mander and Olin Howland. The film was released on December 18, 1942, by Republic Pictures.

Plot
With the help of a WAAC group, Mr. District Attorney smashes a Nazi spy-ring that is selling counterfeit War Stamps and Bonds.

Cast   
 John Hubbard as P. Cadwallader Jones
 Virginia Grey as Terry Parker
 Lloyd Corrigan as Maurice Vaughn
 Robin Raymond as Marianne Panois
 Miles Mander as Paul Panois
 Olin Howland as Oscar Mayberry
 Ben Welden as Henchman Joe
 Marla Shelton as Mrs. Perkins
 Neil Hamilton as Harry Kermit
 Ken Christy as Investigator Dave Cleary
 Dick Rich as Maxie Schmidt

See also 
 Mr. District Attorney (1941)
 Mr. District Attorney in the Carter Case (1941)

References

External links
 

1942 films
American crime films
1942 crime films
Republic Pictures films
Films directed by William Morgan (director)
World War II films made in wartime
American black-and-white films
1940s English-language films